Diego Luiz Landis (born 3 May 1998) is a Brazilian footballer who currently plays as a centre back for Chiangrai United in Thai League 1.

Career statistics

Club

Notes

References

1998 births
Living people
Brazilian footballers
Brazilian expatriate footballers
Association football defenders
Liga Portugal 2 players
Campeonato Brasileiro Série C players
Desportivo Brasil players
FC Porto B players
Mirassol Futebol Clube players
Diego Landis
Diego Landis
Brazilian expatriate sportspeople in Portugal
Expatriate footballers in Portugal